SpongeBob SquarePants 4-D (also known as SpongeBob SquarePants 4-D Ride, SpongeBob SquarePants: The Ride or SpongeBob SquarePants 3-D) was a 2003 cel-shaded 4-D film simulator ride based upon the animated television series SpongeBob SquarePants. It could be found at many aquariums and theme parks across the world. The ride consisted of a pre-show which then leads into a stadium seated auditorium. The ride is in 4-D, meaning it is a motion simulator with a 3D movie. The effects on the ride vary at different parks. Water spray, bubbles, wind, leg ticklers, smoke, and smells are usually found.

The ride debuted in various Paramount Parks locations in May 2003, including King's Island on May 10, 2003.

The ride once appeared at Camp Snoopy in Mall of America as a film rotation of The Mystery Mine Ride. Instead of being in 4-D with special effects, the ride was in 3-D, and the seats would move (causing a very realistic fall during the Rock Bottom sequence). In 2007, the Mystery Mine Ride, which once housed SpongeBob SquarePants: The Ride, was demolished to make way for the SpongeBob SquarePants Rock Bottom Plunge roller coaster, as part of the theme park's transformation into Nickelodeon Universe. In 2008, SpongeBob SquarePants 4-D came to Nickelodeon Family Suites. On April 19, 2013, Nickelodeon Family Suites premiered a successor called SpongeBob SquarePants 4D: The Great Jelly Rescue. Italian, German, Turkish, and Canadian French dubs for the ride were also made.

Plot
The film begins with Painty the Pirate about to sing the television series theme as usual, but he instead pops out of the painting and throws the riders into Bikini Bottom. The audience ends up in The Krusty Krab, where SpongeBob SquarePants welcomes them and shows them how to make a Krabby Patty by pointing at the ingredients with his spatula. When preparing the Krabby Patty, SpongeBob accidentally loses a pickle. The pickle then bounces out of the restaurant into Patrick Star's hand, as he rides on a pogo stick. Patrick then steals the pickle, and SpongeBob, not knowing why, tells the riders to find Patrick on his bubble bike, destroying half of Bikini Bottom. While going through Jellyfish Fields, SpongeBob plummets down the vertical road into Rock Bottom, where a fish pops the bubble bike by biting it. The force of the pop hurdles SpongeBob into the air, landing in the Chum Bucket where Plankton is holding the real Patrick hostage, revealing that the pickle thief was a robotic version of Patrick. The robot then pursues SpongeBob, only to be unplugged by Patrick (looking for an electrical outlet for his toaster). Plankton is crushed by his robot, and SpongeBob recovers the pickle. Sandals enters the Chum Bucket to eat his patty; however, he tells SpongeBob that he ordered his Krabby Patty without pickles (which Spongebob disregards) and then abruptly explodes, leaving only his head and feet. He then explains to him that he is allergic to pickles and walks away as SpongeBob quips, "Well, that was pickle-culiar!"

Cast

Tom Kenny as SpongeBob SquarePants and The Jellyfish
Bill Fagerbakke as Patrick Star
Rodger Bumpass as Squidward Tentacles
Clancy Brown as Mr. Krabs
Mr. Lawrence as Plankton
Dee Bradley Baker as Sandals
Patrick Pinney as Painty the Pirate

Locations

Open and Running

Closed, Replaced, or Cancelled

See also
List of 3D films
List of amusement rides based on television franchises

References

External links
 Official Production Website
 Behind the Voice Actors page

SpongeBob SquarePants
Nickelodeon in amusement parks
Nickelodeon animated films
2003 3D films
2003 films
Amusement rides introduced in 2003
Amusement park films
California's Great America
Six Flags attractions
Cedar Fair attractions
Kings Island
Blur Studio films
4D films
2000s American animated films
3D animated short films